Sri Atmananda Memorial School was a private school that for sixteen years (1995–2011) was located in a historic property north and east of the Hyde Park neighborhood of Austin, Texas. At the end it served grades K-12. Previously it only covered elementary school.

The founding director of the school was Pattye Henderson, whose family had previously owned the school site, an historic mansion and 10-acre (40,000 m2) campus at 4100 Red River Street in Austin, Texas, originally owned by cotton entrepreneur E.H. Perry and his family.

Campus history
The  campus location at 4100 Red River Street was owned by cotton entrepreneur E.H. Perry and his family in the early 20th century. In 1928 the family built a  home, featuring guest houses, a triangular elevator, a bowling alley, and a sunken garden. The home features a Mediterranean villa style that somewhat resembles buildings at the nearby University of Texas.

In 1944 the Perry family moved to the Driskill Hotel and sold the home to Herman Heep. In 1948 the estate opened as a school for the first time, housing St. Mary's Academy for Girls, which had been founded in 1874 and moved from its historic downtown location. At that time a chapel, nun's quarters, and other buildings were added. In 1968, the coed Holy Cross High School replaced the girls' academy. In 1974, the land was purchased by the Henderson family, who founded the private Perry School on the site. In the mid-1990s, the land passed to the Sri Atmananda Memorial School.  The school closed in 2011 after the property was sold to a new owner.

Folk singer Nanci Griffith attended Holy Cross High School together with her friend, Margaret Mary Graham, the subject of Griffith's early song "There's a Light Beyond these Woods (Mary Margaret).

References

External links

 
  Holy Cross High School (site history)

Private K-12 schools in Texas
Education in Austin, Texas
High schools in Austin, Texas
Buildings and structures in Austin, Texas
School buildings on the National Register of Historic Places in Texas
Defunct schools in Texas
National Register of Historic Places in Austin, Texas